is a former Japanese football player.

Career
Hideya Tanaka joined J1 League club Albirex Niigata in 2005. In 2006, he moved to S.League club Albirex Niigata Singapore. In 2007, he backed to Albirex Niigata. He moved to Kataller Toyama in 2008 and Kamatamare Sanuki in 2009.

References

1986 births
Living people
Association football people from Okayama Prefecture
Japanese footballers
J1 League players
Japan Football League players
Albirex Niigata players
Kataller Toyama players
Kamatamare Sanuki players
Association football defenders